The Lipo language, also known as eastern Lisu, is a language of the Lisu people of China, similar to but not intelligible with the Lisu language proper. Some Lipo are classified by the government as Lisu, others as Yi. In some areas, the people prefer the name Lolopo (or Lolongo).

Some Lipo (Lipa 利帕) speakers in Eryuan and Yongsheng counties are also referred to as Tujia (土家) (Yunnan 1956:19-20).

References

External links 
 A 283 word list recording in Kaipuleohone

Loloish languages
Languages of China

zh:彝语中部方言